The Roman Catholic Diocese of Issele-Uku is a diocese located in the city of Issele-Uku, Delta State in the Ecclesiastical province of the Roman Catholic Archdiocese of Benin City, Edo State, Nigeria. It lies on the west bank of the Niger River between Benin City to the west and Onitsha to the east. The diocese comprises six local government areas in the northern portion of Delta State. The Archdiocese of Onitsha borders it on the east and the Archdiocese of Benin City borders it on the west. The Diocese of Uromi is to its north and the Diocese of Warri borders it on the south.

History
The first Mass in the diocese was celebrated on March 5, 1888 and the first missionary was Fr. Carlo Zappa. The Diocese of Issele-Uku was created on July 5, 1973 from the territory which was once part of the Roman Catholic Archdiocese of Benin City. It now covers the northern part of Delta State west of the River Niger and the state capital, Asaba including the following six Local Government Areas of Nigeria: Aniocha North and Aniocha South, Ika North East and Ika South, Oshimili North and Oshimili South, and has a land mass of 3,011 square Km. The diocese has grown from the initial eight parishes with which it began to 44 parishes and 18 independent stations in 2011.

Diocesan statistics
The diocese at the end of the year 2006 had a population of 996,410 people, including 308,596 baptized Catholics, constituting 31% of the population.  Statistics are taken from the Annuario Pontificio.

|-
| 1980 || 64.312 || 406.000 || 15,8 || 23 || 13 || 10 || 2.796 ||  || 10 || 21 || 13
|-
| 1990 || 99.727 || 358.142 || 27,8 || 35 || 30 || 5 || 2.849 ||  || 12 || 46 || 22
|-
| 1999 || 240.184 || 715.878 || 33,6 || 55 || 47 || 8 || 4.366 ||  || 15 || 60 || 31
|-
| 2000 || 245.186 || 734.199 || 33,4 || 60 || 51 || 9 || 4.086 ||  || 18 || 61 || 35
|-
| 2001 || 254.995 || 785.594 || 32,5 || 67 || 58 || 9 || 3.805 ||  || 18 || 61 || 35
|-
| 2002 || 275.300 || 883.790 || 31,1 || 65 || 57 || 8 || 4.235 ||  || 17 || 83 || 36
|-
| 2003 || 283.850 || 905.884 || 31,3 || 66 || 57 || 9 || 4.300 ||  || 18 || 93 || 36
|-
| 2004 || 292.366 || 951.117 || 30,7 || 76 || 66 || 10 || 3.846 ||  || 19 || 101 || 36
|-
| 2006 || 308.596 || 996.410 || 31,0 || 89 || 79 || 10 || 3.467 ||  || 28 || 118 || 36
|-
| 2012 || 364.000 ||1.153.000|| 31,5 ||101 || 89 || 12 ||       ||  || 30 || 150 || 64
|}

Additional statistics
Catholic Churches in the Diocese 61
Nigerian Diocesan Priests 130
Major Seminarians 179
Priests on further studies abroad 7
Priests on Mission in the USA 18

Special churches
St. Paul Cathedral in Issele-Uku. See picture of cathedral:

Bishops
 Bishop Anthony Okonkwo Gbuji (07.05.1973 – 11.08.1996), appointed Bishop of Enugu
 Bishop Emmanuel Otteh (11.08.1996 – 11.14.2003)  Bishop Emeritus
 Rev Michael Odogwu Elue (Apostolic Administrator 11.14.2003 until episcopal ordination on 02.21.2004 see below)
 Bishop Michael Odogwu Elue (see above 02.21.2004 - )

Other priest of this diocese who became bishop
Augustine Obiora Akubeze, appointed Bishop of Uromi in  2005

Bishop's house
P.O. Box 63
Issele-Uku, Delta State, Nigeria
Telephone:  Office: 048 880 187
Asaba Office: 056 280 412
Fax 1: 056 280 412
Fax 2: 048880 0187
GSM: 0803 714 2369

Episcopal regions

Issele-Uku Region
St. Paul's Cathedral, Issele-Uku
St. Raphael's, Akwukwu-Igbo
St. John the Evangelist, Illah
St. Theresa's, Ebu
St. Andrew's, Ezi
St. Matthew's, Idumuje-Unor
Our Lady of Lourdes, Onicha-Olona
All Saints, Onicha-Ugbo
St. James, Ubulu-Okiti
Sacred Heart, Obomkpa
St. Michael's Onicha-Uku
St. Anthony, Ogbe-Ofu, Issele-Uku
St. Lawrence, Issele-Mkpitime
Asaba Region
St. Joseph's, Asaba
St. Patrick's, West End, Asaba
St. Patrick's, Cable Point, Asaba
Our Lady of Assumption, Asaba
St. Brigid's, Asaba
St. Augustine's, Ibusa
St. Monica's, Ibusa
St. Michael's, Okpanam
St. Theresa's, Okwe
St. Michael's, Oko
Ss. Peter and Paul, Issele-Azagba
St. Benedict's, Akwu-Ebolo, Asaba
St. John Bosco, Asaba
Ss. Peter and Paul, Ugbolu
Sacred Heart, Bonsaic

Agbor Region
St. John the Baptist, Agbor
St. Joseph's, Agbor
St. Patrick's, Azu-Owa
St. Patrick's Agbor-Obi
St. Mark's, Alisimie
St. Dominic's, Boji-Boji Owa
Holy Rosary, Abavo
St. John the Evangelist, Ewuru
St. Columba's, Agbor
St. Benedict's, Agbonta
All Saints, Alihami
Umunede Region
Sacred Heart, Umunede
Immaculate Heart, Umunede
St. Dominic, Otolokpo
St. Augustine, Ute-Ogbeje
St. Joseph, Akumazi
St. Luke, Emuhu
Immaculate Heart of Mary, Ute-Okpu
St. Louis, Ekuku-Agbor
St. Martin's, Igbodo
St. Francis Xavier's, Idumesah
St. Jude, Owa-Oyibo

Ogwashi-Uku Region
Mary Immaculate, Ogwashi-Uku
St. Patrick's, Ogwashi-Uku
St. Charles, Ubulu-Uku
St. Michael's, Ubulu-Uku
Holy Trinity, Ewulu
St. Joseph's, Nsukwa
Immaculate Conceptini, Isheagu
Ejeme-Aniogor Independent Station
St. John the Baptist, Ubulu-Unor
St. Theresa's, Obior

Parishes
Map with pointers to parishes and institutions 

Abavo: Holy Rosary Parish, P.O. Box 88, Abavo
Abavo: St. Patrick's Parish, Azu Owa, P.O. Box 70, Abavo
Agbor: St. Columba's Parish, P.O. Box 1051, Agbor
Agbor: St. Joseph's Parish, P.O. Box 749, Agbor
Agbor Boji-Boji: St. John the Baptist Parish, P.O. Box 1600, Boji-Boji, Agbor
Agbor Obi: St. Patrick's Parish, P.O. Box 1725, Agbor-Obi.
Akumazi: St. Joseph's Parish, P.O. Box 336, Umunede
Akwu-Ebolo: St. Benedict's Parish
Akwukwu-Igbo: St. Raphael Parish
Asaba: Church of Assumption Parish, Asaba
Asaba: St. Brigid Parish
Asaba: St. John Bosco Parish
Asaba: St. Joseph's Parish, P.O. Box 25, Asaba.
Asaba Cable Point: St. Patrick's Parish, P.O. Box 793, Asaba
Asaba West End, St. Patrick's Parish, P.O. Box 997, West End, Asaba
 Asaba:St. John Mary Vianney Asaba
 Asaba: Emmanuel the Savior Church Asaba
Ebu: St Theresa's Parish
Ekuku-Agbor: St Louis Parish, P.O. Box 63, Ekuku-Agbor
Ewulu: Holy Trinity Parish, P.O. Box 137, Ogwashi-Uku
Ezi: St Andrew's Parish, PO Box 20, Ezi
Igbuzor (Ibusa): St Augustine's Parish, P.O. Box 93, Ibusa
Igbuzor (Ibusa): St Monica's Parish, P.O. Box 414, Ibusa
Igbuzor (Ibusa): St Thomas Parish
Idumesah: St Francis Xavier Parish, P.O. Box 77, Idumesah
Idumuje-Unor: St Matthew's Parish
Illah: St John the Evangelist Parish, P.O. Box 18, Illah
Isheagu: Immaculate Conception Parish, P.O. Box 16, Isheagu
Issele-Uku: St Paul's Cathedral, P.O. Box 26, Issele-Uku
Nsukwa: St Joseph's Parish, P.O. Box 16, Nsukwa
Ogwashi-Uku: Mary Immaculate Parish, P.O. Box 4, Ogwashi-Uku
Ogwashi-Uku: St Patrick's Parish, P.O. Box 28, Ogwashi-Uku
Okpanam: St Michael's Parish, P.O. Box 155, Okpanam
Okwe: St Theresa's Parish
Onicha-Olona: Our Lady of Lourdes Parish, P.O. Box 40, Onicha-Olona
Onicha-Ugbo: All Saints Parish, P.O. Box 57, Onicha-Ugbo
Otolokpo: St Dominic's Parish, P.O. Box 281, Umunede
Owa-Boji: St Dominic's Parish, P.O. Box 8, Owanta, Boji-Boji
Ubulu-Okiti: St James Parish, P.O. Box 72, Ubulu-Okiti
Ubulu-Uku: St Charles' Parish, P.O. Box 42
Ubulu-Uku: St Michael's Parish, P.O. Box 96
Umunede: Immaculate Heart Parish
Umunede: Sacred Heart, P.O. Box 7, Umunede
Ute-Ogbeje: St Augustine's Parish, P.O. Box 9, Umunede

Independent stations
Agbor-Nta: St. Benedict Catholic Church
Alisimie: St. Mark Catholic Church
Alihami: All Saints Catholic Church
Asaba: Sacred Heart Catholic Church, Bonsiac
Ejeme-Aniogor: St. Felix Catholic Church, P.O. Box 174
Emuhu: St Luke Catholic Church
Ewuru: St John the Evangelist, P.O. Box 1053
Igbodo: St. Martin de Tours Catholic Church
Issele-Azagba: Ss Peter & Paul Catholic Church, P.O. Box 78
Issele-Mkpitime: St. Lawrence Catholic Church
Issele-Uku: St. Anthony of Padua Catholic Church, Ogbe-Ofu
Obior: St. Theresa of Avila Catholic Church
Obomkpa: Sacred Heart Catholic Church, P.O. Box 27, Issele-Uku
Oko: St. Micheal Catholic Church
Onicha-Uku: St. Michael Catholic Church
Owa-Oyibu: St. Jude Catholic Church
Ubulu-Unor: St. John the Baptist, P.O. Box 96
Ugbolu: Ss. Peter and Paul Catholic Church
Ute-Okpu: Immaculate Heart of Mary Catholic Church

Higher institutions chaplaincy
College of Education, Agbor
Delta State University, Asaba Campus, Asaba
Federal College of Education Technical, Asaba
St. John's, Alihagu

Nurseries and primary schools
Holy Infant International School, Agbor
Regina Mundi Nursery/Primary School, Asaba
St. Mary Anne Nursery/Primary School, Ebu
Mercy Nursery/Primary School, Ibusa
St. Maria Gorretti School, Illah
Immaculate Conception Nursery/Primary School, Ishiagu
Holy Child School, Issele-Uku
Divine Love Nursery/Primary School, Ogwashi-Uku
Holy Child School, Onicha-Olona
Divine Love School, Ubulu-Uku
Sacred Heart Nursery/Primary School, Umunede
St. Augustine Nursery/Primary School, Ubulu-Okiti

Secondary schools
Dominican Vocational School, Agbor
Holy Infant Secondary School, Agbor
Madonna Comprehensive Secondary School, Akwukwu-Igbo
St John's Secondary School, Alihagu
Mercy Girls' Secondary School, Aliokpu Agbor
Juniorate Girls' Secondary School, Issele-Uku
Divine Love Secondary School, Ubulu-Uku
 St. Patrick's College, Asaba
 St. Paul's Grammar School, Ebu
 St. Brigid's Girls Grammar School, [Asaba Delta State]
St. Martin De Porres Girls Grammar School, [Onicha-Olona]

Institutions
Madonna School for the Handicapped, Okpanam
Regina Mundi Computers, Ogwashi-Uku

Hospitals and maternities
Catholic Health Centre, Ewulu
Catholic Maternity and Hospital, P.O. Box 98, Ekuku-Agbor
St Anthony's Catholic Maternity, P.O. Box 206, Ubulu-Uku
St Elizabeth's Catholic Maternity, P.O. Box 43, Umunede
St John's Hospital, P.O. Box 1896, Agbor
St Joseph Hospital, P.O. Box 911, Asaba
St Mary's Hospital, P.O. Box 38, Ogwashi-Uku
St Theresa's Hospital, P.O. Box 63, Issele-Uku

Special homes
Pro Labore Dei, Asaba
Home for Old People, Asaba
Home for Destitutes, Agbor
Home for Destitutes, Umunede

Special institutions
Pastoral Centre, Issele-Uku
School of Evangelization, Issele-Uku
Leprosaria, Abor Ogwashi-Uku
Leprosaria, Ute-Enugu

Female religious houses
Daughters of Charity of Saint Vincent de Paul, Okpanam
Daughters of Charity of Saint Vincent de Paul, Box 121, Umunede
DDL Daughters of Divine Love, Akwukwu-Igbo
DDL Daughters of Divine Love, Box 63, Issele-Uku
DDL Daughters of Divine Love, Gbenoba, Agbor-Obi
DDL Daughters of Divine Love, Illah, c/o St John’s, Box 18, Illah
DDL Daughters of Divine Love, Ubulu-Uku
DMMM Daughters of Mary Mother of Mercy , Aliokpu
DMMM Daughters of Mary Mother of Mercy Convent, Box 60, Issele-Uku
DMMM Daughters of Mary Mother of Mercy Convent, Igbuzor
DMMM Daughters of Mary Mother of Mercy, Onicha-Olona
DMMM Daughters of Mary Mother of Mercy, Ubulu-Uku
Dominican Sisters of St. Catherine,, Agbor-Obi
Franciscan Sisters, Ogwashi-Uku
Immaculate Heart Sisters, Okpanam
NES New Evangelization Sisters of Mother of Perpetual Help, Agbor
NES New Evangelization Sisters of Mother of Perpetual Help, Box 63, Issele-Uku
NES New Evangelization Sisters of Mother of Perpetual Help, Box 72, Ubulu-Okiti
NES New Evangelization Sisters of Mother of Perpetual Help, Ogwashi-Uku
OLA Sisters of Our Lady of Apostles,, Box 2170, Agbor
OLA Sisters of Our Lady of Apostles Convent, Box 54, Asaba
SSL Sisters of St Louis (in Nigeria), Ewulu

Male religious houses
OSA Order of Saint Augustine, Box 32, Igbuzor
OP Order of Preachers, St Patrick’s Church, Agbor-Obi, Box 1725, Agbor
SMA Society of African Missions, St Patrick's Church, Cable Point, Asaba, Box 793, Asaba

Priestly formation
Saints Peter and Paul Major Seminary, Ibadan, Oyo State, Nigeria
All Saints Major Seminary, Uhiele-Ekpoma, Edo State, Nigeria
Saint Felix Minor Seminary, P.O. Box 174, Ejeme-Aniogor, Delta State, Nigeria

Politics
The diocese is located in the northern area of Delta State which is structured according to political divisions known as local government areas (L.G.A.s).  There were in 1991 twelve LGAs, then nineteen and now there are 25 LGAs. The Diocese of Issele-Uku now covers six of the local government areas: Aniocha North and Aniocha South, Ika North East and Ika South, and Oshimili North and Oshimili South, and with a land mass of 3,011 square Km.

See also

Roman Catholicism in Nigeria
Template:Nigeria states map
 Outline of Nigeria
 Index of Nigeria-related articles

References

External links
 official website of the diocese, www.issele-ukudiocese.org
 Map showing cities and towns where the diocese and Catholic ministries are serving the people
  Catholic Bishops' Conference of Nigeria
 Catholic Secretariat of Nigeria
 Catholic Hierarchy
 Issele-Uku Landmarks including picture of the Catholic Cathedral
 Saints Peter and Paul Seminary, Bodija, Ibadan, Oyo State, Nigeria
 All Saints Major Seminary, Edo State, Nigeria
 About Delta State showing map of local government areas and giving economic and political descriptions 
 Daughters of Mary Mother of Mercy
 St Louis Sisters in Nigeria
 Sisters of Our Lady of Apostles
 New Evangelization Sisters of Mother of Perpetual Help 

Issele-Uku
Roman Catholic dioceses and prelatures established in the 20th century
Christian organizations established in 1973
Roman Catholic Ecclesiastical Province of Benin City